The 2013–14 Southern Jaguars basketball team represented Southern University during the 2013–14 NCAA Division I men's basketball season. The Jaguars, led by third year head coach Roman Banks, played their home games at the F. G. Clark Center and were members of the Southwestern Athletic Conference. They finished the season 19–13, 15–3 in SWAC play to win the regular season conference championship. They were ineligible for postseason play due to APR penalties. However, the SWAC received a waiver to allow its teams under APR penalties to still participate in the SWAC tournament where the Jaguars lost in the quarterfinals to Prairie View A&M.

Roster

Schedule

|-
!colspan=9 style="background:#1560BD; color:#FFD700;"| Regular season

|-
!colspan=9 style="background:#1560BD; color:#FFD700;"| SWAC tournament

References

Southern Jaguars basketball seasons
Southern
South
South